Galeazzo Sanvitale (died 8 September 1622) was a Roman Catholic prelate who served as Archbishop of Bari-Canosa (1604–1606).

Biography
Galeazzo Sanvitale was born in Parma, Italy in 1566. On 15 March 1604, he was appointed during the papacy of Pope Clement VIII as Archbishop of Bari-Canosa. On 4 April 1604, he was consecrated bishop in the chapel of the Apostolic Sacristy, Rome by Girolamo Bernerio, Cardinal-Bishop of Albano, with Claudio Rangoni, Bishop of Piacenza, and Giovanni Ambrogio Caccia, Bishop of Castro del Lazio, serving as co-consecrators. He served as Archbishop of Bari-Canosa until his resignation in 1606. He died on 8 September 1622.

Episcopal succession

References

External links and additional sources
 (for Chronology of Bishops) 
 (for Chronology of Bishops) 

Roman Catholic archbishops in Italy
Bishops in Apulia
Bishops appointed by Pope Clement VIII
1622 deaths